William Turtle Hopewell was an English footballer who played in the Football League for Derby County.

William Hopewell' first club was Long Eaton Rangers. Hopewell signed in 1886, two years before Rangers became a League The Combination club. The following year (1887) Hopewell moved to Lincolnshire club, Grimsby Town. In season 1887–88 Grimsby Town were still a non–League club but they did reach the Fourth Round of the FA Cup.

William Hopewell moved back to Derbyshire when he signed for Derby County in September 1888. Hopewell made his club and League debut, playing at centre–half, on 13 October 1888, at Thorneyholme Road, the home of Accrington. The home team won 6–2. William Hopewell played in five of the 22 League matches played by Derby County in season 1888–89.

In 1889 William Hopewell was not retained by Derby County and he returned to Grimsby Town. In season 1889–90 Grimsby Town were founder members of the Football Alliance League and finished fourth. They also reached the Second Round of the FA Cup. In 1890 Hopewell moved from Grimsby Town to Doncaster Rovers for the start of their Midland League season, playing at half-back.

Hopewell died at the age of 60/61 in 1928.

References

1867 births
1928 deaths
Footballers from Derby
English footballers
Association football defenders
Long Eaton Rangers F.C. players
Grimsby Town F.C. players
Derby County F.C. players
Doncaster Rovers F.C. players
English Football League players
Midland Football League players